Christian Craig (born July 19, 1991) is an American motorcycle rider who competes in the AMA Supercross Championship.  His most notable achievement is winning the 2022 250 Supercross West title.

Career
Craig competes in the AMA Supercross and AMA Motocross Championships. Craig rides for the Rockstar Husqvarna team in the 450cc class.

Craig won 3 of the first 4 races of the 2022 Supercross season.

2022 250 AMA Supercross West Champion

References

American motocross riders
1991 births
Living people